Aleksandr Pavlovsky (14 July 1936 – 4 July 1977) was a Soviet fencer. He won a bronze in the team épée event at the 1960 Summer Olympics.

References

1936 births
1977 deaths
Belarusian male épée fencers
Soviet male épée fencers
Olympic fencers of the Soviet Union
Fencers at the 1960 Summer Olympics
Olympic bronze medalists for the Soviet Union
Olympic medalists in fencing
Sportspeople from Minsk
Medalists at the 1960 Summer Olympics